Short Circutz was a series of short computer animated videos that were played between television shows on YTV every weekend afternoon and evening from Saturday September 10, 1994 (coinciding with the premiere of ReBoot) until Sunday September 1, 1996. YTV's Short Circutz continued one more year in Canada from September 1996 until August 1997. Most videos were 30 to 120 seconds long, often played between other computer animated shows, such as ReBoot and Beasties. The videos were all sampled from three film collections: The Mind's Eye, its sequel Beyond the Mind's Eye and Imaginaria. Some of the films were re-edited with alternate music, most notably replacing nearly all of the vocal songs used in the Imaginaria shorts.

List of shorts 
There were a total of 32 shorts featured in Short Circutz:

Virtual Reality
Seeds Of Life
Afternoon Adventure
Brave New World
Transformers
Too Far
Windows
Nothing But Love
The Pyramid
Theatre Of Magic
Voyage Home
Creation
Civilization Rising
Heart Of The Machine
Technodance
Post Modern
Love Found
First Flight (Leaving The Bonds Of Earth)The TempleImaginariaAnything Is PossibleLocomotionPear PeopleAll Shapes & Sizes
Rubber Duckies
Gourmet Records
Night Magic
Down The Road
Lucy & RemoStyro The DogMore Bells and WhistlesGoing HomeTrivia
Footage from the Laserdisc game Cube Quest is used more often than footage from any other individual clip in the shorts. Some examples include the jungle tunnel in "Creation," the many tunnels in "All Shapes and Sizes" and the flying ship in "All Shapes and Sizes."
"More Bells and Whistles" is one of the earliest of Wayne Lytle's productions; Lytle now produces more complex variations on the idea with his company, Animusic.
Some clips from the shorts are CGI commercials and promos, like an ID for MusiquePlus in Anything is Possible.

See alsoFunpak''

External links
YTV's official website

Canadian computer-animated television series
YTV (Canadian TV channel) original programming
Canadian motion picture television series
1990s Canadian animated television series
1990s Canadian anthology television series
1994 Canadian television series debuts
1996 Canadian television series endings
Canadian children's animated anthology television series
English-language television shows